The 1904–05 Scottish Division Two was won by Clyde with St Bernard's finishing bottom.

Table

References 

 Scottish Football Archive

Scottish Division Two seasons
2